This is a list of Members of Parliament elected at the February 1974 general election, held on 28 February. This was the first of two general elections to be held that year. Parliament convened on 12 March 1974 at the Palace of Westminster by Queen Elizabeth II. It was dissolved just over six months later on 20 September 1974, making it the shortest UK parliament in history and the shortest parliament to sit at Westminster since 1681.

Composition
These representative diagrams show the composition of the parties in the February 1974 general election.

Note: The Scottish National Party and Plaid Cymru sit together as a party group. This is not the official seating plan of the House of Commons, which has five rows of benches on each side, with the government party to the right of the Speaker and opposition parties to the left, but with room for only around two-thirds of MPs to sit at any one time.



By-election
See the list of United Kingdom by-elections.

Defections

9 July: Greenwich, Woolwich East--Christopher Mayhew defected from Labour to the Liberals

See also
:Category:UK MPs 1974

References 

 

1974 02
February 1974 United Kingdom general election
 
UK MPs